Facial recognition or face recognition may refer to:

Face detection, often a step done before facial recognition
Face perception, the process by which the human brain understands and interprets the face
Pareidolia, which involves, in part, seeing images of faces in clouds and other scenes
Facial recognition system, an automated system with the ability to identify individuals by their facial characteristics